Gudani  is a village in Kapurthala district of Punjab State, India. The village is administrated by a Sarpanch who is an elected representative of village as per the constitution of India and Panchayati raj (India).

Demography 
According to the report published by Census India in 2011, Gudani has total number of 109 houses and population of 593 of which include 308 males and 285 females. Literacy rate of Gudani is 74.23%, lower than state average of 75.84%.  The population of children under the age of 6 years is 73 which is 12.31% of total population of Gudani, and child sex ratio is approximately  738, higher than state average of 846.

Population data

Air travel connectivity 
The closest airport to the village is Sri Guru Ram Dass Jee International Airport.

Villages in Kapurthala

References

External links
  Villages in Kapurthala
 Kapurthala Villages List

Villages in Kapurthala district